Creelsboro Natural Bridge (more commonly referred to as Rock House or the Rockhouse) is a natural bridge in southwestern Russell County, Kentucky, United States. The Rockhouse is classified as a meander natural bridge because it was created by river erosion of a cliff on the outer side of a sharp meander in the river. Jim Creek flows through it before merging into the Cumberland River.

History
The Creelsboro Natural Bridge consists of Upper Ordovician Period silty dolomite of the Cumberland Formation. Unlike most natural bridges it is made of dolomite rather than sandstone. First discovered in 1770 by a group of hunters, Rockhouse is a popular site for camping. It was designated a National Natural Landmark by the U.S. National Park Service in 1987. It remains privately owned but is accessible by a short walk from KY 379. Immediately across the river in Clinton County is the private Rockhouse Trace.

See also

 Kentucky Geological Survey

References

External links
Creelsboro Natural Bridge
Kentucky Geological Survey GQMAPS, S36

Natural arches of Kentucky
National Natural Landmarks in Kentucky
Landforms of Russell County, Kentucky